Radičević is a village in Serbia. It is situated in the Bečej municipality, South Bačka District, Vojvodina province. The village has a Serb ethnic majority and its population numbering 1,332 people (2002 census).

Name
In Serbian the village is known as Radičević (Радичевић), in Hungarian as Csikériapuszta, and in Croatian as Radičević. It is also widely known and often referred to as Čikerija (Чикерија).

Ethnic groups (2002 census)

Serbs = 1,166 (87.54%)
Hungarians = 28 (2.10%)
Yugoslavs = 23 (1.73%)
Croats = 23 (1.73%)
Montenegrins = 14 (1.05%)
others.

Historical population

1961: 1,198
1971: 1,155
1981: 1,117
1991: 1,250

See also
List of places in Serbia
List of cities, towns and villages in Vojvodina

References
Slobodan Ćurčić, Broj stanovnika Vojvodine, Novi Sad, 1996.

External links
Radičević location map

Places in Bačka
South Bačka District
Bečej